The canton of Ouroux-sur-Saône is an administrative division of the Saône-et-Loire department, eastern France. It was created at the French canton reorganisation which came into effect in March 2015. Its seat is in Ouroux-sur-Saône.

It consists of the following communes:
 
L'Abergement-Sainte-Colombe
Allériot
Baudrières
Châtenoy-en-Bresse
Guerfand
Lans
Lessard-en-Bresse
Montcoy
Oslon
Ouroux-sur-Saône
Saint-Christophe-en-Bresse
Saint-Germain-du-Plain
Saint-Martin-en-Bresse
Tronchy
Villegaudin

References

Cantons of Saône-et-Loire